Lusong District is one of four urban districts of Zhuzhou City, Hunan province, China. The district was formed on May 31, 1997, it is named after its seat located near the place of Lusong Road.

Located in the south eastern region of the city proper and on the northeastern shoreside of the Xiang River, the district is bordered to the north by Shifeng, Hetang districts and Liuyang City, to the east by Liling City, to the south by Zhuzhou County, across the Xiang river to the west by Tianyuan District. The district has 7 subdistricts and a town under its jurisdiction.

Administrative divisions
After an adjustment of the divisions of Lusong District on 26 November 2015, Lusong District has 7 subdistricts and a town under its jurisdiction. they are:

7 subdistricts
 Hejiatu
 Jianshe
 Jianning
 Qingyun
 Fengxi
 Longquan
 Dongjiaduan

1 town
 Baiguan

References

www.xzqh.org 

County-level divisions of Hunan
Zhuzhou